"Belfast Child" is a song by Simple Minds, first released as the lead track on the Ballad of the Streets EP on 6 February 1989. The EP also included "Mandela Day" (originally its B-side). The record reached number one on the UK Singles Chart as well as in Ireland and the Netherlands, and it became a top-ten hit in Belgium, New Zealand, Norway, Spain, Switzerland and West Germany.

Style and influence
The song uses the music from the Irish folk song "She Moved Through the Fair", but has completely different words.

Jim Kerr recalled in 1000 UK Number 1 Hits why he used the melody, "I first heard the melody (of She Moved Through The Fair) a few days after the Enniskillen bombing (when a bomb planted by the IRA exploded during a Remembrance Day service at Enniskillen in County Fermanagh, killing 12 people and injuring at least 63), and like everybody when you see the images I was sick. In the second part of the song, I'm trying to relate to people in Northern Ireland who lost loved ones. I'm trying to talk about the madness, the sadness and the emptiness. I'm not saying I have any pearls of wisdom, but I have a few questions to ask".

Reception
The song received rave reviews, receiving a five-star review in Q magazine. In a retrospective review of the single, AllMusic journalist Dave Thompson described "Belfast Child" as being "an epic, heartstring-tugging song. The piece gains even more power in its second half, when the drums and guitar kick in, and the arrangement billows out with instrumentation."

Music video
The music video to the song was shot in black and white and displays footage of children and deprivation in Belfast. It was directed by Andy Morahan and edited by Mark Alchin.

B-sides
The B-side of the single was "Mandela Day", a song recorded to commemorate and performed at the Nelson Mandela 70th Birthday Tribute concert on 11 June 1988 though not released commercially until its inclusion on this single. The CD single and the 12" editions added a cover of Peter Gabriel's "Biko". All three tracks appeared on the band's Street Fighting Years album, released three months later.

Track listings
7" vinyl

12" vinyl

CD

Charts

Weekly charts

Year-end charts

Certifications

References

1989 singles
1989 songs
Dutch Top 40 number-one singles
European Hot 100 Singles number-one singles
Irish Singles Chart number-one singles
Music videos directed by Andy Morahan
Simple Minds songs
Song recordings produced by Stephen Lipson
Song recordings produced by Trevor Horn
Songs about The Troubles (Northern Ireland)
Songs written by Charlie Burchill
Songs written by Jim Kerr
Songs written by Mick MacNeil
UK Singles Chart number-one singles
Virgin Records singles